The 2020 Women's European Water Polo Championship Qualifiers are a series of qualification tournaments aimed to establish the participants of the 2020 Women's European Water Polo Championship. The matches were contested in April and October 2019.

Qualification round
The six teams participating at the QR all advanced to the next stage; the final position of each team established the opponent in the Play-offs. The round was contested from 25 to 28 April 2019 in Rio Maior, Portugal.

Play-offs
The teams ranked from 7th to 12th place at the 2018 EC directly qualified to this stage. The order of play was drawn on 8 June 2019; matchdays are 12 and 26 October 2019.

First leg

Second leg

Qualified teams

Teams already qualified through the 2018 European Championship:
 – Host nation
 – Winners of the 2018 European Championship
 – Runners-up of the 2018 European Championship
 – 3rd place at the 2018 European Championship
 – 5th place at the 2018 European Championship
 – 6th place at the 2018 European Championship

See also 
2020 Men's European Water Polo Championship Qualifiers

References

External links 
Official LEN website
Microplustiming.com (Official results website)

Women
Women's European Water Polo Championship
2019 in water polo